Scythris piratica is a moth of the family Scythrididae. It was described by Edward Meyrick in 1928. It is found in North America, where it has been recorded from New Mexico and Texas.

The wingspan is about 12 mm. The forewings are pale grey in males and rosy-grey-whitish in females. The basal and antemedian broad dark grey fasciae and very broad postmedian band occupy most of the wing, and are more or less confluent on the costa. The hindwings are grey, in females with an irregular streak of black scales along the termen throughout.

References

piratica
Moths described in 1928